The dentinoenamel junction or dentin-enamel junction (DEJ) is the boundary between the enamel and the underlying dentin that form the solid architecture of a tooth.

It is also known as the amelo-dentinal junction, or ADJ.

The dentinoenamel junction is thought to be of a scalloped structure which has occurred as an exaptation of the epithelial folding that is undergone during ontogeny. This scalloped exaptation has then provided stress relief during mastication and a reduction in dentin-enamel sliding and has thus, not been selected against, making it an accidental adaptation.

References

Parts of tooth